Mychocerus is a genus of minute bark beetles in the family Cerylonidae. There are at least two described species in Mychocerus.

Species
These two species belong to the genus Mychocerus:
 Mychocerus discretus (Casey, 1890)
 Mychocerus striatus (Sen Gupta & Crowson, 1973)

References

Further reading

External links

 

Cerylonidae
Coccinelloidea genera